The Central Missouri Mules basketball team represents the University of Central Missouri in Warrensburg, Missouri, in the NCAA Division II men's basketball competition (the school's women's basketball team is known as the "Jennies"). The team is currently coached by Doug Karleskint, who replaced Kim Anderson after his departure to become head coach at the University of Missouri. The Mules currently compete and are one of two founding members of the Mid-America Intercollegiate Athletics Association (MIAA). The basketball team plays its home games in the Multipurpose Building on campus.

Overview 
Central Missouri annually plays a twenty-two-game conference schedule that is preceded by an out-of-conference schedule that includes two exhibition games. The conference schedule consists of playing every MIAA member at least once, some twice.

History
Central Missouri's basketball program was founded in 1905, thirty-four years after the university was founded. Prior to 1912, the Mules were an independent team; in 1912, the Mule were a founding member of the MIAA. Overall, the team has won 24 conference championships and four national titles.

The beginning: 1905–1912
In 1905, the team's first year, Joe Ferguson was named the head coach and only played on game – Co. F Independence. In 1906, the team's first full season, Ferguson led the Normals (as they were known until 1919) to a 7–8 record. In the 1907–08 season, the team's losing record switched and finished with a 7–2 record with Guy Lowman as the coach. In 1908, A.A. Mason took over the team for seasons leaving with a record of 16–10. Frank Winters then took over for the next two seasons as head coach, finishing in 1912 with a record of 9–11.

A new era: first 30 years of the MIAA (1912–1946)
1912 began a new era for the Normals basketball team: the team became a founding member of the Missouri Intercollegiate Athletic Association, and Forrest C. "Phog" Allen took the reins as head coach. In his first two seasons as head coach, Allen lead the team to back-to-back MIAA Championships, combining an overall record of 26–11 and 15–1 MIAA record. The next five seasons, Allen lead the Normals to a record of 58–20 and leaving in 1919 to return to his alma mater, The University of Kansas.

After Allen left for KU, Willard N. Greim took over as coach for the next four seasons. During Greim's tenure, the Mules went 70–21 winning one conference championship in 1920–21. During the 1923 season, Greim coached the first two games, but then Tad C. Reid would coach the remainder of the season, as well as the next 14 seasons. During Reid's 15 seasons, the Mules won four MIAA championships and two National Association of Intercollegiate Basketball (NAIB) National Championships. In both 1937 and 1938, Central Missouri won back-to-back NAIB National Championships. In the 1937 Championship Game, the NAIB's first-ever tournament, Central Missouri took a 35–24 victory over Morningside College, and in 1938, the Mules defeated Roanoke College 45–30 to win their second straight national championship. Following the two back-to-back national championship seasons, Tom Scott led the Mules to an 87–35 record, winning the MIAA Championship for the next five seasons. Clarence Whiteman replaced Scott for one season, and Robert White followed for two more seasons. Scott returned for the 1945–46 season.

Post-World War II: 1946–1975
For the next thirty years after World War II, the Mules saw six coaches come and go, a few who would later go on to lead some NCAA Division I teams very successfully. In 1946, Earl Keth, a member of the 1937 and 1938 Central Missouri State National Championship teams, took the reins as head coach, a position he would hold for 15 seasons. During Keth's first few seasons, the Mules began what would be one of eight losing seasons under Keth. It was not until the 1950–51 season that the Mules won a conference championship under Keth. The next few seasons, though, Keth's teams had losing records, and then winning another conference championship in 1956–57. In 1961, future-NCAA Division I coach, Gene Bartow, took over the program. During his three seasons, Bartow coached the Mules to a 47–21 record, before leaving for Valparaiso University. Following Bartow in 1965 was Joe B. Hall, who led the team to a 19–6 season, and an MIAA conference championship. Chuck Smith coached for one season, 1965–66, finishing with a 14–8, 7–3 MIAA record.

In 1966, Norm Short took over for the Mules, staying for six seasons. In that time Short led the team to a 74–69 record, with two conference championships. After the Mules fell to 7–19 in 1971–72, Jim Kampen replaced Short. Kampen led the team for three seasons with a total record of 32–46.

Another national championship: 1975–2002
In 1975, Tom Smith took over the program for five years. During his five years as head coach, Smith led the Mules to an 86–46 overall record, winning the MIAA Championship in the 1979–80 season. After that season, Smith left for Valparaiso. Former Iowa State coach, Lynn Nance was hired as Smith's successor. During Nance's first season, the Mules won the conference championship. The next two seasons, Nance compiled a record of 43–16 overall with a 17–7 MIAA record. In the 1983–84 season, Nance led the Mules to A Conference Championship and the NCAA Men's Division II Basketball Championship. The following year, Nance led the Mules to another conference title and finished his career at Central Missouri with a 114–35 record.
Nance left Warrensburg after the 1984-85 season, and Nance's assistant coach, Jim Wooldridge, took the reins of the program. In his final three seasons at the helm, Wooldridge led the Mules to the NCAA Tournament, with 20 or more wins each season. Wooldridge left for Southwest Texas State after the 1990–91 season, leaving Central Missouri with a 131–48 overall record. Jerry Hughes, current athletics director for Central Missouri, coached the 1991–92 season as the interim head coach, ending with a 15–13 record.

In 1992, Bob Sundvold was hired as the next head coach, which was his first coaching job. Under Sundvold, the Mules went 81–39 over four seasons. Sundvold's squads made three trips to the NCAA Division II tournament, reaching the Elite Eight in 1995. After Sundvold left, Don Doucette arrived in Warrensburg, compiling a record of 89–76 over six seasons.

Kim Anderson: 2002–2014

On April 12, 2002, Kim Anderson was selected as the next head coach. While at Central Missouri, he won more games than any other coach in school history with a 274-95 (.743) career record. He guided the Mules to two Final Fours, five MIAA regular season championships, four MIAA Tournament Titles and one National Championship.

In the 2006–07 season, the Mules returned to the Division II Elite Eight in Springfield, Massachusetts. They defeated Montevallo to move on to the semi-finals, where they faced the then-unbeaten defending Division II champion Winona State. The Mules lost to Winona in overtime 90–85, ending the season 31–4, which set a new school record for most wins in a season. After the season, the NCAA announced that UCM led all of Division II in attendance for Men's Basketball, at 3,640 fans per home game.

In the 2013–14 season, Anderson led the Mules to a 30–5 overall record and captured the Division II National Championship in Evansville, Indiana. Anderson left to coach at his alma mater, the University of Missouri.

Doug Karleskint: 2014–present
After Anderson left for Missouri, Doug Karleskint was hired as the next coach. In his first season, Karleskint led the Mules to a 25–7 record. That season included a regional appearance as Central Missouri bowed out in the regional semifinals.

Record vs. MIAA opponents

References

External links